S.S. Audace Cerignola, commonly known as Audace Cerignola or simply Cerignola, is an Italian association football club from Cerignola, Apulia.

History 
The club was originally founded in 1912 as Gruppo Sportivo Cerignola. They played Serie C from 1935 to 1937, after which they exclusively took part at amateur leagues.

The club voluntarily stepped out in 2013 due to financial issues, and restarted from Prima Categoria only a year later. In 2017 they returned to play Serie D, a league they had not played since the year 2000.

In 2019, Audace Cerignola ended the season in an impressive second place, behind AZ Picerno; in the following playoffs, they made it to the final, where they defeated Taranto, thus ensuring a priority slot in the Serie C repechages.

However, due to a number stadium-related issues, the Italian Football Federation denied Serie C entry to the club. After winning a first appeal to the Italian National Olympic Committee Court,  and FIGC declining Audace Cerignola's admission due to other stadium-related technicalities, on 5 August 2019 the CONI Court once again overturned the latter's decision, confirming Audace Cerignola's right to take part in the 2019–20 Serie C.

Audace Cerignola were finally promoted to Serie C in the 2021–22 Serie D season, as Group H champions, under the guidance of head coach Michele Pazienza.

Current squad

Out on loan

References

External links
Official website

 
Football clubs in Apulia
Association football clubs established in 1912
1912 establishments in Italy
Serie C clubs